Stanley R. Lee (November 6, 1928 - July 15, 1997) was an advertising executive  who wrote the novels Dunn's Conundrum (1985) and The God Project (1990) under the name "Stan Lee". He was copywriter for the notorious political commercial "Daisy" for the advertising firm DDB Worldwide and worked his way up to Senior Vice President of that company before being laid off in 1974.

References

External links
 

1997 deaths
20th-century American novelists
American male novelists
American advertising executives
20th-century American male writers
1928 births